The Ministry of Energy of Moldova is one of the fourteen ministries of the Government of Moldova. The ministry was established on 16 February 2023 following the restructuring of the Ministry of Infrastructure and Regional Development. Currently, the Moldovan minister of energy is Victor Parlicov. The Ministry of Energy aims for the energy independence of Moldova. It was created following a heavy energy crisis in the country.

References 

Energy
Moldova
Ministries established in 2023